"Mamita" is a song by American boy band CNCO and the third single from their second self-titled studio album. It was written by Johan Espinosa, Claudia Brant, Juan Pablo Piedrahita, Daniel Giraldo, and its producers Feid, El Rolo and Mosty. The song was released by Sony Music Latin on October 20, 2017. A remix with Brazilian singer Luan Santana was released on March 26, 2018.

Music video 
The music video was directed by Daniel Duran and filmed in Quito, the capital of Ecuador.  Five women take the band on adventures through the city, visiting the Quilotoa volcano, the crystal palace and the Quito Cathedral. Before its release, the group had previously released a video with footage of the band performing the song during shows.

Critical reception/Remix 
Latin Times described the song as having "some of the sexiest lyrics to date",  with a "fun video that celebrates their Latin heritage".

Charts

Weekly charts

Year-end charts

Certifications

References 

CNCO songs
2017 songs